Maxence Boitez (born 16 October 1990 in Orléans), better known by his artistic name Ridsa (stylized as RIDSA), is a French rapper and singer of Spanish descent.

Biography 
After practicing soccer in his youth, he started rapping in 2010 putting his materials online gaining popularity. Recordings included collaborations with Flavie in "Toi et seulement toi", with Demhys in "J'aime quand" and with Latino, Cween, Angèle, Nabila etc. On 28 December 2012 he released "Amour Secret" with an accompanying music video. But it was his collaboration with Willy William and Canadian drummer Ryan Stevenson that gave him his first commercial success with the charting "Je n'ai pas eu le temps" and an EP Es tu fiesta containing "Es tu fiesta" and more mixes of "Je n'ai pas eu le temps".

Ridsa released his first album Mes histoires on 2 June 2014 with collaborations with Wanz, Dieselle, Pépé Rosso and Angèle. The album peaked at number 44 on the official French SNEP Albums Chart. The follow-up album L.O.V.E, released on 9 March 2015, made it to number 16. It featured collaborations with Marvin, Dieselle, Souf and DJ Kayz. He had further chart success with collaborations notably with Souf on the single "Baby" and with Kenza Farah on "Liées". His third album Tranquille was released on 11 December 2015. The track "Là c'est die" from the album became his biggest commercial success, reaching number 5 on the official French SNEP singles chart. A second track from the album, "Pardon", also charted. On 5 March 2017, Ridsa officially announced his fourth album, Libre, on Twitter.

Discography

Albums

EPs

Singles

*Did not appear in the official Belgian Ultratop 50 charts, but rather in the bubbling under Ultratip charts.

Appearances / Featured in

*Did not appear in the official Belgian Ultratop 50 charts, but rather in the bubbling under Ultratip charts.

Other songs

References

External links
Facebook
YouTube

French rappers
French male singers
French pop singers
Pop rappers
1990 births
Living people
21st-century French singers
French people of Spanish descent
Musicians from Orléans